Favillea is a genus of fungi within the Sclerodermataceae family.

External links
Index Fungorum

Boletales
Boletales genera